"Closer than Close" is a song by American musician Rosie Gaines, a former singer in Prince and the New Power Generation. After being released in 1995 as a track on her fifth album by the same name, bootlegs of garage mixes started appearing. Thus started a two-year mission by Glaswegian house and garage indie Big Bang Records to release the track properly in 1997. It peaked at number four in the UK and number six on the US Billboard Hot Dance Club Play chart. "Closer than Close" is Gaines' most successful song to date, and widely considered as a club classic.

Background and release
After her solo debut in 1985, recording/performing with The Curtis Ohlson Band from 1987 to 1989 and doing other projects, singer Rosie Gaines joined Prince & The New Power Generation. She continued afterwards as a solo artist/session singer and released her fifth album, Closer than Close in 1995 before she was dropped from Motown Records. Two years later, a remix of the title track from the album was released as a single by Big Bang Records, after it had appeared on bootlegs. It was highly successful in the UK, reaching number four on the UK Singles Chart in May 1997.

Additionally, it peaked at number 11 in Ireland, number 23 in Iceland and number 36 in New Zealand. On the Eurochart Hot 100, the single peaked at number 14. It was produced by DJ Hippie Torrales and Mark Mendoza and has sold over 8 million units worldwide. "Closer than Close" went on to become a huge club favorite and earned Gaines a MOBO Award for Best International Single at the '97 Awards show, beating off the likes of P Diddy, previously known as Puff Daddy, R. Kelly and Tina Moore. A music video was made to accompany the remix, featuring Gaines performing in a club.

Critical reception
Joe Rassenfoss from US newspaper Citizens Voice said that the 1995 version of "Closer than Close" "finds Gaines at home in a slower groove, her voice weaving mellifluously." Scottish newspaper Daily Record called the 1997 remix a "forgettable funk song from former Prince sidekick Rosie, who is now setting out to become a star in her own right." James Hyman from Music Weeks RM rated it four out of five, describing it as a "bumpy house track that's already received endless radio play, especially on Kiss. Commercially comparable to the Nightcrawlers' 'Push The Feeling On', this "Let's get close, closer yeah, closer than you can ever imagine us", title hook rests over a strong clacking house beat with simple chord changes throughout plus short scats thrown into the mix." He concluded, "A clear Top 10 hit."

Impact and legacy
In 2015, The Daily Telegraph ranked "Closer than Close" at number 38 in their Top 50 Dance Songs list.

In 2017, Dave Fawbert from ShortList described it as a "eternal banger".

In 2019, Mixmag listed it in their two lists, the 20 Best Diva House Tracks and the 40 Best UK Garage Tracks of 1995 to 2005. They wrote:

Gemtracks included the "Mentor Remake" of the song in their list of the "top UK garage songs between 1995–2005".

Track listing
 UK, 12-inch single (1997)"Closer than Close" (Mentor Remake)
"Closer than Close" (Tuff Jam's Unda Vybe)
"Closer than Close" (Frankie's Climatic Revelation)

 Europe, CD maxi (1997)"Closer than Close" (Mentor Original Radio Edit) – 3:44
"Closer than Close" (Mentor Remake Radio Edit) – 3:51 

 Europe, CD maxi (1997)'
"Closer than Close" (Mentor Original Radio Edit) – 3:44
"Closer than Close" (Frankie's Classic Radio Edit) – 4:08
"Closer than Close" (Mentor Remake) – 6:39
"Closer than Close" (Mentor Club Mix) – 7:28
"Closer than Close" (Tuff Jam's "Even Closer" Mix) – 6:59
"Closer than Close" (Frankie's Classic Club Mix) – 10:20

Charts and certifications

Weekly charts

Year-end charts

Certifications

References

1995 songs
1997 singles
Rosie Gaines songs
American house music songs